Joshua Lloyd Thomas (born June 26, 1981) is a former American football defensive end. He was signed by the Indianapolis Colts as an undrafted free agent in 2004 and later won Super Bowl XLI with them, defeating the Chicago Bears. He played college football at Syracuse.

Early years
Thomas attended High School in Orchard Park, New York and played TE & DE. As a senior in 1999, Josh set a New York State sack record with 23.5 sacks in an 11-game season.

College career
He was a three-year starter at Syracuse University who opened 34 of 36 career games and had 124 career tackles, nine sacks, 23 tackles for losses and two interceptions. Thomas started 11 games as a senior, 10 games as a junior when he led DL with six passes defensed and was third on line with 33 tackles and second on the team with eight QB pressures. He started 13 games as a sophomore and posted 46 tackles, seven for losses, and 15 pressures. He appeared in two games as a freshman and had a season-high five tackles, one sack and one interception against Buffalo.

Professional career
He signed as an undrafted free agent with Colts on April 30, 2004. In 2004 as a rookie FA, he played in first 11 games before sustaining season-ending knee injury at Detroit 11/2/2004, he had 18 tackles, 11 solo, one sack, four  pressures and one forced fumble. In 2005, he started two of 12 games at DE and had 29 tackles, 19 solo, eight  pressures and three sacks. In 2006, he saw action in 14 games and made 35 tackles, 29 solo, one sack and one fumble recovery. In 2007, he started seven of 15 games, five at LDE and two at RDE, filling in for injured Dwight Freeney and made career-high 55 tackles, 33 solo, 1.0 sack, 14 pressures, one forced fumble and three passes batted. In 2008, he started three of 16 games and had 35 tackles, 26 solo, five pressures and one batted pass.

Thomas was released after the 2008 season. The Colts re-signed him on August 18, 2009. He was re-signed during the season but released again on November 11.

References

External links
 Indianapolis Colts bio
 Syracuse Orange bio

1981 births
Living people
Players of American football from Massachusetts
American football defensive ends
Syracuse Orange football players
Indianapolis Colts players